Ingrid Goude (born May 26, 1937) is a Swedish actress and model. She became an actress in B-movie and sci-fi motion pictures of the late 1950s and early 1960s. Her parents were Mr. and Mrs. Edward K. Goude. Her father was the manager of a steel plant in Sandviken. Her mother's name was Valdy.

Film contract
Goude won the 1956 Miss Sweden beauty pageant. As second runner-up in the 1956 Miss Universe, and 1st runner-up in Miss Europe contests, Goude signed a Universal Pictures film contract on July 25, 1956. The studio also offered contracts to the 1956 Miss Universe, Carol Morris, and Marina Orschel of Germany, the 1st runner-up. Universal picked up her option during Christmas 1956 and requested that she report back to the studio on January 8.

Goude won the right to manage all of the earnings from her Universal contract in September 1957. The contract was paying $250 per week at the time. It called for her to invest 20% of her earnings in government bonds. A superior court judge in Los Angeles waived this proviso. He noted that Goude would turn twenty-one on May 26, 1958. Also, he noted, the contract was signed thirteen months earlier, and she had lived within her means since then. Universal started her at $150 weekly with a maturation salary of $800 a week. After eighteen months with Universal, Goude asked for and was granted her release from her studio agreement in January 1958.

Actress
Neither Morris nor Orschel was successful in movies. Goude earned a role as a secretary in The Big Beat (1958). The film is studded with musicians like Harry James and Fats Domino in its cast. She played Beulah, a bride, in Once Upon a Horse... (1958). The comedy was written by Dan Rowan and Dick Martin and produced by Universal. Goude trained for this part at the Los Angeles Athletic Club. There she learned to use boxing gloves under the supervision of Duke Llewellyn, athletic director.

In July 1957 Goude went to Denver, Colorado, to play hostess for Night Passage (1957), a motion picture starring James Stewart and Audie Murphy.

Goude was cast with James Best and Ken Curtis in January 1959, in The Killer Shrews. A production of the Hollywood Pictures Corporation, the sci-fi movie was filmed on location in Dallas, Texas and was backed financially by Gordon and B.R. McClendon. Goude still had a Swedish accent, which presented a contradiction to the American accent of her onscreen father Baruch Lumet. The film's dialogue makes playful pokes at this, presenting the reason for her accent as an unrevealed secret.

Television
In her brief career, Goude played in several television series, including Flight (1957), Steve Canyon (1959–1960), Johnny Staccato (1959), The Bob Cummings Show (syndicated as Love That Bob), and The Best of the Post (1961).

Personal life
Goude married Jerome K. Ohrbach ( 1990) in Palm Springs, California, in April 1962. He was president of Ohrbach's department stores. The couple made their home in Beverly Hills after a honeymoon in Europe. She was married to Arthur Ryan from 1976 to 1982. After her divorce, she married Fritz Ingram ( 2015).

References

Los Angeles Times, They're In The Swim For Miss Universe, July 11, 1956, Page 3.
Los Angeles Times, Miss Universe Contest Trio Signs for Films, July 26, 1956, Page 21.
Los Angeles Times, Hedda Hopper; Good News, December 19, 1956, Page B10.
Los Angeles Times, Hedda Hopper, July 2, 1957, Page B6.
Los Angeles Times, Three Nations To Join In All-Star Film; Wise Guides Gable, Lancaster, July 19, 1957, Page 25.
Los Angeles Times, Court Waives Savings Plan For Swedish Girl, September 5, 1957, Page 5.
Los Angeles Times, Blond Boxer, October 15, 1957, Page C4.
Los Angeles Times, Localities Launch Movies In Dallas, January 27, 1959, Page C7.
Los Angeles Times, Ingrid Goude Wed To Jerome K. Ohrbach, April 3, 1962, Page C2.
New York Times, Ingrid Goude Married To Jerome K. Ohrbach, April 2, 1962, Page 28.
Suburbanite Economist, Hollywood Promenade'', January 29, 1958, Page 14.

External links

 

1937 births
Ingram family
Living people
Miss Sweden winners
Miss Universe 1956 contestants
People from Sandviken Municipality
Swedish emigrants to the United States
Swedish female models
Swedish film actresses
Swedish television actresses